The Paterson pageant was a dramatic depiction of the 1913 Paterson silk strike acted by the strikers themselves in New York City's Madison Square Garden while the strike was ongoing. Staged by John Reed and other bohemians of Greenwich Village, the pageant played before a full audience and received positive reviews, though its public support and sympathy did not translate into success for the six-month strike, which crumbled following the pageant. One of the Wobbly leaders behind the strike, Elizabeth Gurley Flynn, credited the pageant with hastening strike's end, having split the strikers' attention from their primary cause.

The pageant attracted early career artists including Robert Edmond Jones, who designed the poster, and John Sloan, who painted the 90-foot mills backdrop.

References

Further reading

External links 

 Pageant program
 John Reed additional papers, 1909–1939 at Harvard University Libraries

1913 plays
1913 in labor relations
Industrial Workers of the World in New York (state)
Madison Square Garden
1913 in New York City
Industrial Workers of the World in New Jersey